Thomas Ramsey may refer to:

Toad Ramsey (1864–1906), American Major League Baseball player
Tom Ramsey (born 1961), former American football quarterback
Thomas Ramsey (MP) for Wallingford (UK Parliament constituency)
Thomas Ramsey (mayor) (1510–1590), Lord Mayor of London
Thomas F. Ramsey (1858–1911), member of the Wisconsin State Assembly
Tom Ramsey (politician), member of the Georgia State Senate

See also
Thomas Ramsay (disambiguation)